Antaeotricha elatior is a moth in the family Depressariidae. It was described by Cajetan Felder, Rudolf Felder and Alois Friedrich Rogenhofer in 1875. It is found in Brazil (Amazonas).

References

Moths described in 1875
elatior
Moths of South America